Yosef Tzvi Dushinsky may refer to:

 Rabbi Yosef Tzvi Dushinsky (first Dushinsky rebbe) (1865–1948)
 Rabbi Yosef Tzvi Dushinsky (third Dushinsky rebbe), current Rebbe of the Dushinsky Hasidic dynasty